McAnuff is a surname. Notable people with the surname include:

Des McAnuff (born 1952), American musical theatre director
Jobi McAnuff (born 1981), English and Jamaican footballer
Winston McAnuff (born 1957), Jamaican singer
Matthew McAnuff (1987–2012), Jamaican singer, son of Winston McAnuff